Shekhar Dutt was the governor of the Indian state of Chhattisgarh. Earlier he had served on various bureaucratic posts including, as an IAS officer, as Secretary in the Ministry of Defence of the Government of India.

Career
Dutt belongs to the 1969 batch of IAS from Madhya Pradesh cadre. Dutt became a short service commission officer in the Indian Army and was awarded the Sena Medal for gallantry during the Indo-Pakistani War of 1971. He held various posts in the Madhya Pradesh government, including Principal Secretary in the Department of Tribal and Scheduled Caste Welfare and Principal Secretary, Departments of School Education, Sports & Youth Welfare.

Dutt was appointed Secretary of the Department of Ayurveda, Yoga, Naturopathy, Unani, Siddha & Homeopathy in the Ministry of Health and Family Welfare of India. As Director General of the Sports Authority of India, Dutt played a role in the hosting of the Afro-Asian Games in Hyderabad, India in November 2003.

He eventually became the Joint Secretary in the Department of Defence Production and later took over as the Defence Secretary of India in 2005. In July 2007, Dutt retired as Defence Secretary and was appointed Deputy National Security Advisor for a two-year term.

In September 2009, Dutt was named to the board of trustees of DeSales University.

On 23 January 2010, he assumed the office of the Governor of Chhattisgarh, the post to which he served till his resignation on 18 June 2014.

Honors and awards
   Honorary degree and FellowSwansea University 2018

Book
“Reflections on Contemporary India” written by Shri Shekhar Dutt and launched by the President of India on 11-Feb-2014.

References

External links
 H.E. Shri Shekhar Dutt, Governor of Chhattisgarh

Governors of Chhattisgarh
Living people
Defence Secretaries of India
Indian Administrative Service officers
1945 births